Ingolfiella is a genus of amphipod in the family Ingolfiellidae, containing the following species:

Ingolfiella abyssi Hansen, 1903
Ingolfiella alba Ianilli, Berera & Cottarelli, 2008
Ingolfiella australiana Lowry & Poore, 1989
Ingolfiella bassiana Lowry & Poore, 1989
Ingolfiella beatricis Ruffo & Vonk, 2001
Ingolfiella berrisfordi Ruffo, 1974
Ingolfiella britannica Spooner, 1960
Ingolfiella canariensis Vonk & Sànchez, 1991
Ingolfiella catalanensis Coineau, 1963
Ingolfiella cottarellii Ruffo & Vigna-taglianti, 1989
Ingolfiella dracospiritus Griffiths, 1989
Ingolfiella fontinalis Stock, 1977
Ingolfiella fuscina Dojiri & Sieg, 1987
Ingolfiella georgei Andres, 2005
Ingolfiella gobabis Griffiths, 1989
Ingolfiella grandispina Stock, 1979
Ingolfiella inermis Shimomura, Ohtsuka & Tomikawa, 2006
Ingolfiella ischitana Schiecke, 1973
Ingolfiella kapuri coineau & Rou, 1972
Ingolfiella littoralis Hansen, 1903
Ingolfiella longipes Stock, Sket & Iliffe, 1987
Ingolfiella macedonica S. Karaman, 1959
Ingolfiella manni Noodt, 1961
Ingolfiella margaritae Stock, 1979
Ingolfiella petkovskii S. Karaman, 1957
Ingolfiella putealis Stock, 1976
Ingolfiella quadridentata Stock, 1979
Ingolfiella quokka Gallego-Martinez & Poore, 2003
Ingolfiella rocaensis Senna & Serejo, 2005
Ingolfiella ruffo Siewing, 1958
Ingolfiella sandroruffoi Andres, 2004
Ingolfiella similis Rondé-Broekhuizen & Stock, 1987
Ingolfiella tabularis Stock, 1977
Ingolfiella thibaudi Coineau, 1968
Ingolfiella unguiculata Stock, 1992
Ingolfiella uspallatae Noodt, 1965
Ingolfiella vandeli Bou, 1970
Ingolfiella xarifae Ruffo, 1966

References

Ingolfiellidea
Taxonomy articles created by Polbot